40 y Tantos (International Title: 40 Something) is a Chilean telenovela produced by TVN and directed by María Eugenia Rencoret and Ítalo Galleani. The series was written by Marcelo Leonart, Ximena Carrera, Andrea Franco, Carla Stagno and José Fonseca.

Plot
Diego (Francisco Melo), Rosario (Francisca Imboden), Marco (Francisco Pérez-Bannen) and Miguel Elizalde (Matías Oviedo) are four brothers who live the crisis forty and have just lost their father. Diego, who is the oldest, is in charge of his father's company,  Elizalde Communications, where he works with his two brothers, Rosario and Marco, and his assistant and lover, Susana Jerez (Mónica Godoy). After Loreto Estevez (Paola Volpato), his wife, caught him in the act of infidelity with his lover, he tries to win her love over again but Loreto asks for a divorce.

Rosario is a working single mother who has to deal with Diego as the chief of the family business and has to raise his son Cristóbal (Nicolás Brown), who is addicted to drugs and has connections with Joaquin Sarda (Andrés Velasco), his best friend and partner in the firm, who is going to marry Renata Santelices (Katyna Huberman).

Marco is a married gamer, who supports his family, and is immature as well as the only witness to the relationship between his niece, the daughter of Diego and Loreto, Fernanda Elizalde (Juanita Ringeling) and a professor of the university, Gaspar Mellado (Bastián Bodenhöfer), who is 30 years her senior.

Finally Miguel, the youngest brother, returns from abroad and learns of the death of his father. Miguel is supported by his brothers because he does not work and has to deal with the demons of a relationship he had with the wife of Marco, Tatiana (Claudia Burr), before he went abroad and which had a daughter, Camila (Javiera Osorio), which is supposed to be his brother.

Cast
 Francisco Melo as Diego Elizalde
 Paola Volpato as Loreto Estévez
 Francisca Imboden as Rosario Elizalde
 Francisco Pérez-Bannen as Marco Elizalde
 Matías Oviedo as Miguel Elizalde
 Claudia Burr as Tatiana Arizmendi
 Nicolás Brown as Cristóbal Cuesta
 Mónica Godoy as Susana Jerez
 Andrés Velasco as Joaquín Sardá
 Katyna Huberman as Renata Santelices
 César Caillet as Génaro Monckeberg
 Juanita Ringeling as Fernanda Elizalde
 Bastián Bodenhöfer as Gaspar Mellado
 Javiera Osorio as Camila Elizalde
 Jorge Velasco as Damián Elizalde

References

External links
Official web site
 

2010 telenovelas
2010 Chilean television series debuts
2011 Chilean television series endings
Chilean telenovelas
2010s Chilean television series
Spanish-language telenovelas
Televisión Nacional de Chile telenovelas